Manjeet Shrestha (born 30 November 1984) is a Nepalese cricketer. All-rounder Manjeet is a right-handed batsman and a right-arm medium-pace bowler. He made his debut for Nepal against Hong Kong in October 1998.

He represents the Vishal Warriors of the Nepal Premier League, Region no. 1 Biratnagar of the National League and Merryland College, which plays in the SPA Cup.

Playing career 

Manjeet was awarded Player of the Series award in the 2011 SPA Cup.

References

External links 
 Manjeet Shrestha on ESPNcricinfo
 Manjeet Shrestha on CricketArchive
 Manjeet Shrestha's Facebook Profile

Living people
1984 births
People from Biratnagar
Nepalese cricketers